The Helen B. Warner Prize for Astronomy is awarded annually by the American Astronomical Society to a young astronomer (aged less than 36, 
or within 8 years of the award of their PhD) for a significant contribution to observational or theoretical astronomy.

List of winners
This list is from the American Astronomical Society's website.

See also

 List of astronomy awards

References 

Astronomy prizes
American awards
Awards established in 1954
American Astronomical Society